Benjamin Bataille (born 25 July 1992) is a French handball player who plays for Saint-Raphaël Var.

References

External links
 Benjamin Bataille at European Handball Federation
 Benjamin Bataille at Ligue nationale de handball

French male handball players
1992 births
Living people
Montpellier Handball players
Handball players at the 2010 Summer Youth Olympics